Christian Colson (born 15 September 1968) is a British film producer. He is best known as the producer of the 2008 film Slumdog Millionaire, for which he received numerous awards including the Academy Award for Best Picture, Golden Globe Award for Best Motion Picture – Drama, and BAFTA Award for Best Film. In 2014, both Danny Boyle and Christian Colson signed a first look deal with FX Productions.

Filmography

Producer
 The Descent (2005)
 Separate Lies (2005)
 Eden Lake (2008)
 Slumdog Millionaire (2008)
 The Descent Part 2 (2009)
 Centurion (2010)
 127 Hours (2010)
 Trance (2013)
 Selma (2014)
 Steve Jobs (2015)
 Trainspotting 2 (2017)

References

External links 
 

British film producers
Living people
Filmmakers who won the Best Film BAFTA Award
Producers who won the Best Picture Academy Award
1968 births
Golden Globe Award-winning producers
People educated at Claires Court School